Sayers is a surname. Notable people with the surname include:

 Alan Sayers, New Zealand athlete
 Ben Sayers, early professional golfer
 Dorothy L. Sayers (1893–1957) English crime writer
 Edna Sayers (1912–1986), Australian cyclist
 Edward Sayers (aviator) (1897–1918), English World War I flying ace
 Edward Sayers (doctor) (1902–1985), New Zealand doctor
 Edward Sayers (politician) (1818–1909), New South Wales politician
 Eddie Sayers (born 1941), Northern Irish loyalist
 Foster J. Sayers, Medal of Honor recipient
 Gale Sayers (1943–2020), American professional football player
 James Sayers, British illustrator
 Joe Sayers (cricketer), English cricketer
 Joseph D. Sayers, the 22nd governor of Texas
 Laura Sayers, British radio producer
 Marguerite Sayers, BE CEng FIEI, President for Engineers Ireland
 Mark Sayers, Computer hacker
 Michael Sayers, Irish poet and author
 Peig Sayers, Irish author and seanchaí
 Royd R. Sayers, American physician and industrial hygienist 
 Thomas Sayers,  English bare-knuckle prize fighter
 Zehra Sayers, Turkish biologist

Fictional characters
 Lena Sayers, a character in the anime series My-Otome
 Nina Sayers, the titular character in the film Black Swan

See also
 Sayer
 Sayers (disambiguation)